The Spruce Creek Mound Complex is a prehistoric and early historic archeological site in Port Orange, Florida. The mound complex, major earthworks built out of earth and shell middens, was constructed by ancient indigenous peoples.  It is located near Port Orange, on the southwest bank of Spruce Creek. On December 3, 1990, it was added to the U.S. National Register of Historic Places.

The Spruce Creek Mound, located on a bluff above the river, was still tall enough during early colonial years to be used by travelers as a point of navigation.  It was used as a ceremonial center and burial mound, and was believed to have been built from 500 to 1000 AD. The mound was added to over centuries, with layers of burials built upon each other.

At the time of European encounter, the site was used by Timucuan natives.  They had harvested and eaten so much local shellfish, which comprised the bulk of their diet, that they left large shell middens. The site also has historic European artifacts from the early colonial period (1550-1700 AD).  This suggests it was one of the villages visited by Spanish explorers, traders and/or colonists.

References

External links

 Volusia County listings at National Register of Historic Places
 Volusia County listings at Florida's Office of Cultural and Historical Programs
 Doris Leeper Spruce Creek Preserve

Mounds in Florida
Archaeological sites on the National Register of Historic Places in Florida
Shell middens in Florida
Native American history of Florida
Archaeological sites in Florida
National Register of Historic Places in Volusia County, Florida
Timucua
Buildings and structures in Port Orange, Florida